The Expendables is an American ensemble action thriller franchise spanning a film series,  written by Sylvester Stallone, based upon characters created by David Callaham, and additional media. The film stars an ensemble cast notably of Sylvester Stallone and Jason Statham, produced by Basil Iwanyk and Guymon Casady. The film series, an acknowledgement to former blockbuster action films made in the 1980s and 1990s, also pays homage to action stars of former decades, and the more recent stars in action. The series consists of four films: The Expendables (2010), The Expendables 2 (2012), The Expendables 3 (2014), the upcoming The Expendables 4 (2023), and an ongoing comic book series: The Expendables Go to Hell (2021). Though criticism with regards to plot and dialogue between characters has been expressed, critics praised the use of comic relief in between action. All films have been box office successes.

Films

The Expendables (2010)

The Expendables, a group of elite mercenaries who carry out all sorts of missions, ranging from assassination to rescue, are deployed to a South American island, Vilena, to overthrow a Latin American dictator, General Garza, who is interfering with the plans of a group of "people" led by a man known only as Mr. Church. However, the team leader, Barney Ross, soon realizes that Garza is merely a puppet being controlled by a ruthless rogue CIA officer, James Monroe, who is Mr. Church's real target.

The Expendables 2 (2012)

A while after the first film, the Expendables accept another mission from Mr. Church to make up for losses caused by the mission in Vilena, but they end up in a conflict with a rival mercenary group, the Sangs, and their newest and youngest member is murdered by their leader, Jean Vilain. Ross swears vengeance on Vilain for his protegé's death and starts to track him down, in the process learning that Villain threatens the world with five tons of weapons grade plutonium he intends to excavate from an abandoned Soviet mine and sell to the highest bidder.

The Expendables 3 (2014)

The Expendables come face to face with the team's co-founder Conrad Stonebanks. Ross was forced to kill Stonebanks after he became a ruthless arms trader, but Stonebanks survived and has now made it his mission to destroy The Expendables. Ross resorts to recruiting a new and younger generation of Expendables to help the team overcome his old adversary.

The Expendables 4 (2023)

In March 2014, Pierce Brosnan stated that he had agreed with producer Avi Lerner to star in The Expendables 4 film. By April of the same year, Stallone revealed his first choice for the villain was Jack Nicholson, while mentioning his interest in convincing Clint Eastwood to join the production. By November of the same year, it was announced that the project is being developed with intent to receive an R-rating. In December 2016, Stallone announced that the fourth installment will be the final film in the series, while a scheduled tentative release date was set for 2018. By March 2017, Stallone had left the project and the franchise, due to creative differences over the script and direction for continuing the franchise.

In January 2018, after vocal support from other cast members (including Schwarzenegger), Stallone announced his return with a post to his social media platforms; confirming new developments on the fourth film. Couture confirmed his involvement in March of the same year. In July 2018, Gregory Poirier announced his role as screenwriter. Production was tentatively scheduled to begin by April 2019, though it wasn't until July of that year that Stallone announced that he was continuing to work on the script for the project. The script was completed later that year, though negotiations with producers were ongoing. In June of the same year, Van Damme expressed interest in returning to the franchise, publicly pitching his idea of playing Claude Vilain, the brother to his villain character from The Expendables 2.

In January 2020, a spin-off film centered around Statham's character titled The Expendables: A Christmas Story, was reported to be in development. In late-2019, Duncan Jones entered early negotiations to serve as director. Later, D.J. Caruso replaced Jones, from a script by Max D. Adams. Stallone will reprise his role, while Schwarzenegger and Tony Jaa are in negotiations to return to and join the franchise, respectively. The production budget will be $70 million. The project will be a joint-venture between Millennium Media and Nu Image Productions.

By August 2020, Vértice Cine announced their involvement as a production company, alongside Lionsgate and Millennium Films. They also revealed that Hughes will return as director, and announced the release date for 2022. In November 2020, the president of Millennium Media, Jeffrey Greenstein, stated that the studio is continuing to work on The Expendables 4 after various delays within the industry worldwide due to the COVID-19 pandemic. In April 2021, Couture stated that work on the script is ongoing and that principal photography is tentatively scheduled for fall of 2021–2022. In July 2021, Stallone confirmed he was still working on the project by sharing some pre-production design work on his social media that he had completed for the film. By August of the same year, the fourth film was officially announced by Millennium Media, Stallone confirming his involvement, and that the "Christmas Story" portion of the title previously reported was not a spin-off, but in fact a working-title for The Expendables 4, Stallone stating that production would commences in October of that same year, with Scott Waugh serving as director, replacing Hughes, with a script written by Max D. Adams with revisions from Spenser Cohen. Sylvester Stallone, Jason Statham, Dolph Lundgren, and Randy Couture will reprise their roles; while Curtis "50 Cent" Jackson III, Megan Fox, Tony Jaa, and Andy García will join the cast. Statham will additionally serve as producer alongside Kevin King Templeton, Les Weldon, Yariv Lerner, Jeffrey Greenstein and Jonathan Yunger. The project will be a join-venture production between Millennium Media, Lionsgate and Campbell Grobman Films. Principal photography was scheduled to begin in October of the same year. Filming officially commenced on October 6, 2021.

Television
In May 2012, it was announced that a television spin-off of the film series had entered development at Lionsgate. In March 2015, it was confirmed that the franchise will expand, with a television event series in active development. The project will be a joint-production between CBS Television Studios, Lionsgate Television, Shane Brennan Prods., and Rogue Marble Productions. Shane Brennan has signed on as creator, producer and showrunner; as well as serving as co-writer with Greg Coolidge and Kirk Ward. Stallone will serve as executive producer alongside Avi Lerner, Kevin King, Grant Anderson, and Brennan. The plot of the series was announced to feature a new team of Expendables, composed of 'iconic television stars', who are on a mission to stop the dangerous activities of terrorist organizations.

Originally scheduled to air on Fox network, beginning in June 2016 the series was being shopped around to other networks and streaming services. In November 2021, President of Millennium Films Jeffrey Greenstein, confirmed that the studio is once again actively developing a television series for the franchise. In November 2022, Greenstein reiterated that development for a television series is ongoing, with plans to expand each of the studio's franchises into additional media.

Main cast and characters

Additional crew and production details

Reception

Box office performance

Critical and public response

The Expendables received mixed reviews from critics. On review aggregator Rotten Tomatoes the film has a 42% approval rating based on reviews from 210 critics, with an average rating of 5.3/10. The website's consensus states: "It makes good on the old-school action it promises, but given all the talent on display, The Expendables should hit harder." On Metacritic, which assigns a normalized rating out of 100 to reviews from critics, the film has received a mean score of 45, based on 35 reviews. CinemaScore polls reflect solid audience approval with a B+ average grade.

The Expendables 2 received mixed reviews from critics. On Rotten Tomatoes the film has a 67% approval rating from 134 critics, with an average rating of 5.9/10. The website's consensus states: "Taut, violent, and suitably self-deprecating, The Expendables 2 gives classic action fans everything they can reasonably expect from a star-studded shoot-'em-up — for better and for worse." Metacritic gave it a score of 51 out of 100, based on reviews from 28 critics, indicating "mixed or average" reviews. CinemaScore polls reported that moviegoers gave the film an average grade of A− on an A+ to F scale, compared to The Expendables B+.

The Expendables 3 received negative reviews from critics. On Rotten Tomatoes, the film holds a 31% rating based on 178 reviews with an average rating of 4.9/10. The site's consensus reads: "Like its predecessors, The Expendables 3 offers a modicum of all-star thrills for old-school action thriller aficionados — but given all the talent assembled, it should have been a lot more fun". On Metacritic, the film has a score of 35 out of 100 based on reviews from 35 critics.

Music

Soundtracks

Other media

Comic books
 The Expendables: A miniseries based on and serving as a prequel to the titular film, written by Chuck Dixon and published by Dynamite Entertainment in 2010. The comic series featured artwork by Esteve Polls.
	
 The Expendables Go to Hell: Conceptualized during the writing of the second film, the series was written by Chuck Dixon, from the original story co-written by Sylvester Stallone and Dixon. Based on a concept that Stallone had written for a movie he knew would never be produced, together with writing contributions from Richard C. Meyer, the series centers around the supernatural war that the titular mercenaries face after being killed and their adventures in hell. Together the team works to thwart the devil and his army of villainous minions (including Adolf Hitler, Sadam Hussein, Joseph Stalin, and Osama bin Ladin, among others). Funded through an online campaign, the series is published by Splatto Comics.

Video games
 The Expendables 8-bit is a single-player side-scroller browser video game created by Flipline Studios as a promotion for the first movie in collaboration with Lionsgate. Stylized after Nintendo Entertainment System games, playable characters included Barney Ross, Lee Christmas, and Yin Yang. It was available for free on the official Facebook page for the movie.
 The Expendables 2 Videogame is a downloadable four-player cooperative shoot 'em up video game. It was published by Ubisoft for PC, PlayStation Network (PSN) and Xbox Live Arcade (XBLA) and released on July 31, 2012 for PSN and August 20 for PC (via Steam) and XBLA. The game's plot is a prequel to The Expendables 2, with Barney Ross, Gunnar Jensen, Yin Yang and Hale Caesar appearing as playable characters. Lundgren and Crews voiced their respective characters. According to review aggregation websites Metacritic and GameRankings, the game received generally negative reviews.
 The Expendables 2: Deploy & Destroy is a single-player tower defense, real-time strategy online-only game. Published by Roadshow Films and Soap Creative, the game was released on July 13, 2012. Its plot was derived from village scenes in the film, where players can choose their squad from the cast, set up defenses and battle the enemy.
 The Expendabros: A standalone expansion of the game Broforce, which was based on The Expendables 3 and released in August 2014. Later, The Expendabros expansion became free to play in order to promote The Expendables 3 and remained so until December 31 of the same year when it was discontinued.

Bollywood adaptation
In May 2013, Original Entertainment confirmed to have sealed a five-picture deal with Millennium Films to produce Bollywood remakes of First Blood, The Expendables, 16 Blocks, 88 Minutes, and Brooklyn's Finest, with the productions for First Blood and The Expendables expected to start at the end of that year.

Canceled projects

The Expendabelles
In October 2012, plans for an all-female centered film were announced titled, The Expendabelles. Karen McCullah and Kirsten Smith were hired to co-write the script, while Avi Lerner, Mark Gill, Julie Kroll, Boaz Davidson, and Kevin King will serve as producers. The film was intended to be a joint production between Millennium Films, Eclectic Pictures, and Summertime Entertainment. Stallone is not involved with the project. By the following month , Lerner had entered early negotiations with actresses Meryl Streep, Cameron Diaz and Milla Jovovich to star in the film. The producer stated that they were looking for a female director for the project, while also stating that principal photography was scheduled to take place in Bulgaria, where previous installments had been filmed.

By February 2014, it was announced that Robert Luketic had been hired as director. Stallone stated that he is not involved with the spin-off, but that he would like to see Sigourney Weaver appear in the movie. By August, Lerner stated that the script was nearing its final draft. Later that month, the studio released an updated official synopsis for the film as: "The Expendables universe has a new team. An elite group of highly trained female mercenaries are brought together for a covert hostage rescue mission. Once they are behind enemy lines, the women discover that they will also need to topple an evil dictator bent on world domination. It becomes clear there is no such thing as the right man for the job. The ExpendaBelles is the ultimate story of female empowerment and kick-ass teamwork." All studios involved had intended to begin production early-2015. In November 2022, President of Millennium Films, Jeffrey Greenstein officially stated that the project was shelved. Stating that the project went through various iterations of having to "explain" why a team of only females was the center of the movie, the creatives have opted to instead integrate more female characters into the franchise.

References

External links

 Official Facebook page
 Official Lionsgate page
 
 Interview with Gary Daniels, The Brit

 
Film series introduced in 2010
Action film franchises
Lionsgate franchises
Fictional mercenaries
Fictional paramilitary organizations